The Guinea Corn Formation is a geologic formation in Jamaica. It preserves fossils dating back to the Cretaceous period.

IUGS geological heritage site
In respect of it being the 'most diverse and thickest limestone succession with abundant rudist bivalves within the Caribbean faunal province', the International Union of Geological Sciences (IUGS) included the 'Late Cretaceous rudist bivalves of the Caribbean Province' (Rio Minho, Clarendon parish) in its assemblage of 100 'geological heritage sites' around the world in a listing published in October 2022. The organisation defines an IUGS Geological Heritage Site as 'a key place with geological elements and/or processes of international scientific relevance, used as a reference, and/or with a substantial contribution to the development of geological sciences through history.'

See also

 List of fossiliferous stratigraphic units in Jamaica

References

 

Cretaceous Jamaica
First 100 IUGS Geological Heritage Sites